This is a list of the national tennis associations in the world. There are six Regional Associations, 145 Full Members and 61 associate Members without Voting rights.

The six Regional Associations are:

Asia: Asian Tennis Federation (ATF) with 44 Members.
Africa: Confederation of African Tennis (CAT) with 51 Members.
South America: Confederacion Sudamericana de Tenis (COSAT) with 10 Members.
Central America and the Caribbean: Confederation de Tenis de Centroamerica Caribe (COTECC) with 33 Members.
Oceania: Oceania Tennis Federation (OTF) with 19 Members.
Europe: Tennis Europe (TE) with 49 Members.

Asian Tennis Federation (ATF) 

Full Members (34):
 
 
 
 
 
 
 
 
 
 
 
 
 
 
 
 
 
 
 
 
 
 
 
 
 
 
 
 
 
 
 
 
 
 

Associate Members (10):
 
 
 
 
 
 
 
 
 
 
Non ITF-Members (1):

Confederation of African Tennis (CAT) 

Full Members (29):
 
 
 
 
 
 
 
 
 
 
 
 
 
 
 
 
 
 
 
 
 
 
 
 
 
 
 
 
 

Associate Members (22):
 
 
 
 
 
 
 
 
 
 
 
 
 
 
 
 
 
 
 
 
 
 
Non ITF-Members (2):

Confederacion Sudamericana de Tenis (COSAT) 
Full Members (10):

COTECC (Central America and the Caribbean) 

Full Members (18):
 
 
 
 
 
 
 
 
 
 
 
 
 
 
 
 
 
 

Associate Members (14):

Oceania Tennis Federation (OTF) 

Full Members (2):
 
 

Associate Members (17):

Tennis Europe (TE) 

Full Members (50):
 
 
 
 
 
 
 
 
 
 
 
 
 
 
 
 
 
 
 
 
 
 
 
 
 
 
 
 
 
 
 
 
 
 
 
 
 
 
 
 
 
 
 
 
 
 
 
 
 
 
Non ITF-Member (1):

Not a Regional Association affiliated 
ITF Members (2):

Sources 

www.itftennis.com